José Luis García Zalvidea (born 2 February 1955) is a Mexican politician affiliated with the Party of the Democratic Revolution. As of 2014 he served as Senator of the LX and LXI Legislatures of the Mexican Congress representing the Federal District. He also served as Deputy during the LVIII Legislature.

References

1955 births
Living people
People from Mexico City
Members of the Senate of the Republic (Mexico)
Members of the Chamber of Deputies (Mexico)
Party of the Democratic Revolution politicians
21st-century Mexican politicians